John or Johnny Graham may refer to:

Arts and entertainment
John Graham (painter) (1754–1817), Scottish painter and teacher of art
John D. Graham (1886–1961), American painter
Jon Dee Graham (born 1959), guitarist and songwriter from Austin, Texas
John Galbraith Graham (1921–2013), British crossword compiler under the name "Araucaria"
John J. Graham (1923–1994), American graphic artist
John R. Graham (composer), American film composer
John Graham (producer) (fl. 2000s), British music producer

Military
John de Graham (died 1298), Scottish soldier
Sir John de Graham (died 1337), Scottish noble
John Graham, Earl of Menteith (died 1346), Scottish soldier
John Graham (pirate) (fl. 1683–1686), English pirate active off New England
John Graham (British Army officer, born 1778) (1778–1821), founder of Grahamstown, South Africa
John Graham (British Army officer, born 1923) (1923–2012)
John Graham of Duchray, Scottish landowner and soldier

Politics

United Kingdom
John Graham, 4th Earl of Menteith (c.1529–c.1565), Scottish nobleman
John Graham, 6th Earl of Menteith (c.1571–c.1598), Scottish nobleman
John Graham, 3rd Earl of Montrose (1548–1608), Scottish peer
John Graham, 4th Earl of Montrose (died 1626), Scottish peer
John Graham, 1st Viscount Dundee (1648–1689), Scottish nobleman and soldier
John Graham (died 1755), Scottish politician, MP for Stirlingshire 1722–27
John Graham (Irish republican) (1915–1997), Irish republican
Sir John Graham, 4th Baronet (1926–2019), British diplomat who was ambassador to Iraq, Iran and NATO
John Graham (loyalist) (born c. 1945), Ulster loyalist figure

United States
John Graham (diplomat) (1774–1820), American acting Secretary of State
John A. Graham (1911–1979), Illinois state senator
John H. Graham (1835–1895), U.S. Representative from New York
John Stephens Graham (1905–1976), attorney and political appointee

Elsewhere
John Graham (New Zealand politician) (1843–1926), New Zealand politician
John Graham (Manitoba politician) (1864–1951), politician in Manitoba, Canada
John Graham (Australian politician), member of the New South Wales Legislative Council
John Graham (Nunavut politician), politician in Nunavut, Canada

Religion
John Graham (clergyman) (1774–1844), champion of Protestantism in Ireland
John Graham (bishop) (1794–1865), bishop of Chester, 1845–1865
John Anderson Graham (1861–1942), Scottish vicar and missionary
John Joseph Graham (1913–2000), American prelate of the Roman Catholic Church
John Graham of Balfunning (1778–1865), minister of the Church of Scotland and landowner

Sports

Football
Alex Graham (footballer) (1889–1972), sometimes identified as John Graham, Scottish footballer for Arsenal, Brentford, Scotland
John Graham (forward) (1873–?), English footballer who played as a forward for Newton Heath (Manchester United)
John Graham (full back) (1873–1925), English footballer for Millwall, Arsenal, Fulham
John Graham (footballer, born 1926), English footballer for Aston Villa, Wrexham, Rochdale, and Bradford City
Johnny Graham (footballer, born 1857) (1857–1927), Scottish footballer for Preston North End in the 1880s
Johnny Graham (Australian footballer) (1875–1946), Australian rules footballer
Johnny Graham (footballer, born 1945) (1945–2018), Scottish footballer for Falkirk, Hibernian, Ayr United
Johnny Graham (footballer, born 1947), Scottish footballer for Dumbarton
John R. Graham (footballer), English footballer for Newcastle United and Bradford City in the 1900s

Other sports
John Graham Jr. (golfer) (1877–1915), Scottish amateur golfer
John Graham (rugby union) (1935–2017), New Zealand player, administrator, and educator
John Graham (long-distance runner) (born 1956), Scottish marathon runner
John Graham (hurdler) (born 1965), Canadian track and field athlete
John Graham (racing driver) (born 1966), Canadian
John Graham (cricketer) (born 1978), English cricketer

Other
John Graham, Lord Hallyards, Scottish law lord murdered in 1592
 John Graham, Sr. (1873–1955), architect and founder of John Graham & Company
John Graham, Jr. (architect) (1908–1991)
John Graham (journalist) (1926–1974), British political journalist and editor
John Graham (Canadian activist) (born 1954), First Nations and AIM activist who murdered opponent
John Graham (policy analyst) (born 1956)
John Graham (economist) (born 1961), American economist and professor
John Benjamin Graham (1814–1876), English settler and investor in South Australia who built "Graham's Castle"
John Gilbert Graham (1932–1957), American mass murderer
John Murray Graham (1809–1881), Scottish historian

See also
Jack Graham (disambiguation)